Issa Alassane-Ousséni (born 10 May 1961) is a Beninese sprinter. He competed in the men's 100 metres at the 1988 Summer Olympics.

References

External links

1961 births
Living people
Athletes (track and field) at the 1988 Summer Olympics
Athletes (track and field) at the 1996 Summer Olympics
Beninese male sprinters
Olympic athletes of Benin
Place of birth missing (living people)